Sarcarsamakulam,  also known as Kovilpalayam, is a western suburb in Coimbatore in the Indian state of Tamil Nadu. This town is located 17 kilometers from Coimbatore Junction and 12 kilometers from Coimbatore International Airport, Tamil Nadu, India, on the Sathyamangalam Road (National Highway 209). Neighbouring places are Saravanampatti, Kalapatti, Vilankurichi

Demographics
 India census, Sarcarsamakulam had a population of 7728. Males constitute 50% of the population and females 50%. Sarcarsamakulam has an average literacy rate of 63%, higher than the national average of 59.5%: male literacy is 71%, and female literacy is 56%. In Sarcarsamakulam, 9% of the population is under 6 years of age.

Politics
It falls under the Kaundampalayam Assembly Constituency.

Culture
The Kaalakaleshwara Temple, dedicated to Shiva, lies on the banks of the Kousika River at Kovilpalayam. In this temple can be found Dakshinamoorthy statue which is the largest Dakshinamoorthy. People from all over Tamil Nadu and from other states visit on Pradosham day festivals. Another festival, Sura Samharam, for Lord Muruga, takes place after the next week of Deepavali festival.

Kavayakaliamman Temple is located near the Kaalkaleswarar temple in the same area in the past named as Kavayanpathi, and named after King Kavayan. The temple there is dedicated to the goddess (KALI) Shakti. The deity is seen holding a Thirisoolam (trident) and Agni (fire) in her two hands. In the prahara of the temple, there are statues of three soldiers sacrificing themselves by cutting their heads with swords. The specialty of the temple is that there is a practice of navagandam (people sacrificing themselves to the goddess). Fridays of the Tamil months of Aadi (July–August), Thai (January–February), as well as Sundays, full moon days, new moon days, and Navratri, are auspicious days for the temple. This is a family deity or folk deity of fourteen clads of the kongu regions as called from the early Chola periods.

Other temples include SakthiMariamman Temple and Veeramachi Amman Temple in between the township and in the east "Patthuraasi amman" temple and Mahalakshmi amman temple. All these temples are located in between the township of kovilpalayam. This area predominantly agricultural area and was lastly before the British was ruled by "palayakarerkal". SriKaalakaleswara temple was built by Chola kings during their rule of kongu region, who had built big temples like "Bragadeeshwara" and later all maintained by the Kongu kings. The principal Deity Lord Kaalaeswarar is "syambulingam" said to be worshiped by "Markendayan" who deferred his death on worshiping Kaakaleswarer.

Education
The major educational institutes are:
 GRG Polytechnic College
 Info Institute of Engineering
 The Indian Public School
 Kovai vidyashram CBSE school
 Swathantra Higher Secondary School

References

External links
 http://www.india9.com/i9show/-Tamil-Nadu/Kovilpalayam-80733.htm
 http://www.india9.com/i9show/Kaalakaaleswarar-Temple-43797.htm
 https://web.archive.org/web/20040616075334/http://www.censusindia.net/results/town.php?stad=A&state5=999
 http://wikimapia.org/13253869/KovilPalayam-Sarkar-Samakulam

Cities and towns in Coimbatore district
Suburbs of Coimbatore